The 1922 Five Nations Championship was the eighth series of the rugby union Five Nations Championship following the inclusion of France into the Home Nations Championship. Including the previous Home Nations Championships, this was the thirty-fifth series of the annual northern hemisphere rugby union championship. Ten matches were played between 2 January and 8 April. It was contested by England, France, Ireland, Scotland and Wales.

Table

Results

Wales: Joe Rees (Swansea), Cliff Richards (Pontypool), Brinley Evans (Llanelli), Islwyn Evans (Swansea), Frank Palmer (Swansea), Billy Bowen (Swansea), Bobby Delahay (Bridgend), Tom Parker (Swansea) (capt.), Jack Whitfield (Newport), Thomas Jones (Newport), Steve Morris (Cross Keys), Tom Roberts (Risca), John Griffiths Stephens (Llanelli), Dai Hiddlestone (Neath), William Cummins (Treorchy)

England: BS Cumberlege (Blackheath), CN Lowe (Blackheath), EDG Hammett (Blackheath), E Myers (Bradford), Harold Day (Leicester), VG Davies (Harlequins), CA Kershaw (US Portsmouth), R Edwards (Newport), ER Gardener (Devonport Services), JS Tucker (Bristol), Wavell Wakefield (Harlequins), AF Blakiston (Blackheath), AT Voyce (Gloucester), GS Conway (Cambridge U), LG Brown (Blackheath) (capt.)

External links

1922
Five Nations
Five Nations
Five Nations
Five Nations
Five Nations
Five Nations
Five Nations Championship
Five Nations Championship
Five Nations Championship
Five Nations Championship